Joseph-Édouard Fortin (June 10, 1884 – April 9, 1949) was a Canadian provincial politician. He was the Liberal member of the Legislative Assembly of Quebec for Beauce from 1929 to 1935. He was also mayor of Beauceville, Quebec from 1922 to 1925. His son, Carrier Fortin, was also a member of the Legislative Assembly of Quebec.

References

1884 births
1949 deaths
Mayors of places in Quebec
People from Capitale-Nationale
Quebec Liberal Party MNAs